Īle Parish is an administrative territorial entity of Dobele Municipality, Latvia.

Towns, villages and settlements of Īle parish 

There are three small settlements located in the Īle parish. These are Stirnas, Īle and Mūrīši. The largest of these three is Īle which is where the center of parish is located.

Stirnas has grown around an 18th or 19th century manor, which is now long abandoned. In the last decades Stirnas population's been waning. Stirnas is located on the coast of Lielauce Ezers, and at the opposite coast the Lielauce Castle stands erected.

Parishes of Latvia
Dobele Municipality
Semigallia